Nationality words link to articles with information on the nation's poetry or literature (for instance, Irish or France).

Events

Works published

United Kingdom
 Thomas Cooke, An Ode on Poetry, Painting, and Sculpture, published anonymously
 Thomas Denton, Immortality; or, The Consolation of Human Life, published anonymously
 John Duncombe, The Feminiad: or, Female Genius, a Poem, which circulated in manuscript before being published this year (a second edition, now called The Feminead, came out in 1757). The poem celebrates virtuous learned women and was meant to encourage women to write.
 Thomas Gray, The Progress of Poesy
 Henry Jones, The Relief; or, Day Thoughts, occasioned by Edward Young's The Complaint 1742
 Jonathan Swift, The Works of Jonathan Swift, published posthumously; edited by John Hawkesworth; five more volumes were published from 1764 through 1765 and six volumes of letters from 1766 through 1768
 Thomas Warton the younger, Observations on the Faerie Queene of Spenser, criticism
 William Whitehead, Poems on Several Occasions

English, Colonial America
 John Mercer, The Dinwiddianae Poems and Prose, begins on November 4 (continues until 1757), a satiric series using puns, mock-heroics and invective attacking the policies of Virginia Governor Robert Dinwiddie and General Edward Braddock; English Colonial America
 William Shirley, The Antigonian and Bostonian Beauties: A Poem, English, Colonial America

Other
 Solomon Gessner, Daphnis, Switzerland, German-language

Births
Death years link to the corresponding "[year] in poetry" article:
 March 11 – Juan Meléndez Valdés (died 1817), Spanish
 March 24 – Joel Barlow (died 1812), American poet and diplomat
 May 23 – William Drennan (died 1820), Irish
 June 18 – Anna Maria Lenngren (died 1817), Swedish
 August 27 – John Codrington Bampfylde (died 1796), English
 September 25 – Thomas Maurice (died 1824), English poet and clergyman
 December 24 – George Crabbe (died 1832), English
 Earliest likely year – Jane Cave (died 1812), Welsh

Deaths
Birth years link to the corresponding "[year] in poetry" article:
 January 28 – Ludvig Holberg (born 1684), Danish/Norwegian poet and playwright
 February 1 – Elizabeth Tollet (born 1694), English
 March 25 – William Hamilton (born 1704), Scottish Jacobite
 October 28 – Friedrich von Hagedorn (born 1708), German
 Seán Clárach Mac Domhnaill (born 1691), Irish

See also

Poetry
List of years in poetry

Notes

18th-century poetry
Poetry